Sinha Basnayake, PC is a Sri Lankan lawyer. He was a former Director of the General Legal Division of the United Nations Office of Legal Affairs and a member of the Internal Justice Council.

Son of the prominent lawyer Hema Henry Basnayake, QC; he was educated at the Royal College, Colombo and graduated with a first-class in law from the University of Oxford. After qualifying as a barrister he joined the UN as a Legal Officer in the  International Trade Law Branch of the Office of Legal Affairs, eventually becoming its Director. Appointed a President's Counsel by the government of Sri Lanka, he has served in many committees of the UN.

In 1999, he served as the Secretary of the group of legal experts of the International Criminal Tribunal for the former Yugoslavia and International Criminal Tribunal for Rwanda; in 2004 he served as a member of the Special Panel set up by the Secretary-General to investigate and report on the bombing of the United Nations headquarters in Baghdad; and in 2005 he served as the Secretary of the Group set up by the Secretary-General to study the criminal accountability of staff and experts on mission serving in peacekeeping operations, as suggested by the Prince Zeid report on a comprehensive strategy to eliminate future sexual exploitation and abuse in United Nations peacekeeping operations.

References

Living people
Sri Lankan officials of the United Nations
Sinhalese lawyers
Alumni of Royal College, Colombo
Alumni of the University of Oxford
President's Counsels (Sri Lanka)
Year of birth missing (living people)